Øyrane is a neighborhood in the town of Førde in the municipality of Sunnfjord in Vestland county, Norway, just west of the town center. The river Jølstra empties into the Førdefjorden just west of Øyrane.

History
The town of Førde was declared as a "center of growth" in 1965, which resulted in a series of public agencies and industrial enterprises being built in the town. The selection of Førde was tied to its central location within Sogn og Fjordane county. Immediately after the appointment, work started on establishing an industrial facility at Øyrane. The Industrial Development Corporation of Norway established an industrial park at Øyrane in 1968 and there was established a shipyard, Ankerløkken Verft. In 1970, Førde Airport, Øyrane opened at the site. The site was poorly suited for an airport, and in 1986 it was replaced by Førde Airport, Bringeland, a little farther away from the town.

References

Villages in Vestland
Sunnfjord